Çarşı is a light-rail station on the Karşıyaka Tram line of the Tram İzmir system in İzmir, Turkey. The station is located between 2018th Street and the Bostanlı Creek and consists of two side platforms served by two tracks. Both platforms are wheelchair-accessible and are integrated with the citywide smartcard, İzmirimkart.

Şht. Cengiz Topal Avenue is located just northwest of the station, which is an automobile-free road for pedestrians and tram traffic only. Many cafes and shops are located along the avenue. 

Çarşı station was opened on 11 April 2017.

References

Railway stations opened in 2017
2017 establishments in Turkey
Karşıyaka District
Tram transport in İzmir